Oberneukirchen is a municipality in the district of Urfahr-Umgebung in the Austrian state of Upper Austria.

Population

References

Cities and towns in Urfahr-Umgebung District